The Journey is a 1992 Argentine drama film directed by Fernando Solanas. It was entered into the 1992 Cannes Film Festival.

Cast
 Walter Quiroz - Martin
 Soledad Alfaro - Vidala
 Ricardo Bartis - Monitor
 Christina Becerra - Violeta
 Marc Berman - Nicolas
 Chiquinho Brandão - Paizinho
 Franklin Caicedo - Rower
 Carlos Carella - Tito The Hopegiver
 Ângela Correa - Janaina
 Liliana Flores - Wayta
 Juana Hidalgo - Amalia Nunca
 Justo Martínez - Faustino
 Kiko Mendive - Americo Inconcluso
 Francisco Nápoli - Raul
 Fito Páez - Pablo
 Nathán Pinzón - District Attorney

References

External links

1992 films
1990s Spanish-language films
1992 drama films
Films directed by Fernando Solanas
Argentine drama films
1990s Argentine films